Vallathol Nagar railway station (VTK) falls between  and Mullurkara railway station in the Shoranur–Cochin Harbour section of Thrissur district. Vallathol Nagar railway station is operated by the Chennai-headquartered Southern Railways of the Indian Railways. It is the base station for Kerala Kalamandalam and last station in the Thiruvananthapuram railway division.

History
The station is named after Vallathol Narayana Menon or popularly known as Mahakavi Vallathol, Kerala's greatest poet in Malayalam language. Vallathol Narayana Menon was instrumental in establishing the Kerala Kalamandalam in Cheruthuruthi, a major centre for learning Indian performing arts, especially those that developed in Kerala.

References

Thiruvananthapuram railway division
Railway stations in Thrissur district